Tunku Abdul Rahman Hassanal Jeffri ibni Sultan Ibrahim (born 5 February 1993) is a Malaysian professional race car driver and member of the Johor Royal Family.

Background
Tunku Abdul Rahman Hassanal Jeffri is the son of Sultan Ibrahim Ismail of Johor. His father is the current head of state of Johor. He is also a professional race car driver currently racing in the Australian GT Championship with Triple Eight Race Engineering.

Honours 

He was awarded :
  Knight Grand Commander of the Order of the Crown of Johor (DPMJ) – Dato' (11 April 2009) 
  First Class of the Royal Family Order of Johor (DK I) (22 November 2012)
  Grand Knight of the Order of Sultan Ibrahim of Johor (SMIJ) – Dato' (2015)
  Sultan Ibrahim Coronation Medal (PSI, 1st class) (23 March 2015).
  Sultan Ibrahim Medal (PSI I, 1st class) (23 March 2017)

Ancestry

References 

1993 births
Living people
House of Temenggong of Johor
Royal House of Perak
First Classes of the Royal Family Order of Johor
Malaysian people of Malay descent
Malaysian Muslims
Tunku Abdul Rahman
Malaysian people of English descent
Malaysian people of Danish descent
Malaysian people of Chinese descent
Malaysian military personnel
Malaysian racing drivers
Sons of monarchs